Bugle Boy Industries, Inc. was a clothing company founded by William Mow in 1977. It is perhaps best known for its namesake brand of denim jeans that were popular in the 1980s. The company declared bankruptcy in 2001.

William C. W. Mow (Traditional Chinese: 毛昭寰) was born in Hangzhou, China, and later moved with his family to the United States. He graduated from Rensselaer Polytechnic Institute in 1959 and then earned an MSEE from Polytechnic Institute of Brooklyn and a Ph.D. in electrical engineering from Purdue University in 1967. He worked for Litton Industries for two years before venturing out on his own. Mow founded Macrodata based on his invention of a method of testing large-scale integrated chips and the company went public in 1973. Around 1976, Mow sold his shares and left the company due to an investigation by the SEC. Although he was later cleared, he had to stay out of the electronics design industry for a few years due to a non-competition clause he had signed with Macrodata.

In 1977, Mow founded Bugle Boy Industries. During the 1980s, the company enjoyed continued growth. Sales approached $1 billion, making Bugle Boy one of the largest privately owned apparel companies in the United States, but the company fell into troubled times in 2001, declared bankruptcy, and was sold that year for $68.6 million. The Bugle Boy brand was purchased in 2001 by Schottenstein Stores Corp., owner of Retail Ventures and several retail chains.

Bugle Boy featured men's and boys' clothing, often with a denim theme. Elastic cuffs at the bottom of the jeans and cross-stitching patterns were also a major part of the Bugle Boy style, with brands such as Pilot and Cotler being its contemporaries. They also popularized parachute pants during the breakdancing fad of the early 80s, in a line called Countdown. Bugle Boy also produced men's and boys' tops, but was best known for its varieties of jeans and jean shorts. As of 2018, the Bugle Boy brand is no longer in use.

In 2001, Bugle Boy closed all 215 of its U.S. outlet stores in an agreement with the U.S. Bankruptcy Court. All the operation centers in China, Taiwan, Singapore were also closed. Their store at Gurnee Mills remained open to sell off remaining inventory.

References

External links 
2001 Asian Week article on the rise and fall of Bugle Boy 

Jeans by brand 
Clothing companies established in 1977
1980s fashion
1990s fashion
1977 establishments in California
Companies disestablished in 2001
2001 disestablishments in California